A beetle bank, in agriculture and horticulture, is a form of biological pest control.  It is a strip, preferably raised, planted with grasses (bunch grasses) and/or perennial plants, within a crop field or a garden, that fosters and provides habitat for beneficial insects, birds, and other fauna that prey on pests.

Usage 
Beetle banks are typically made up from plants such as sunflowers, Vicia faba, Centaurea cyanus, coriander, borage, Muhlenbergia, Stipa, and buckwheats (Eriogonum spp.). Beetle banks are used to reduce or replace the use of insecticides, and can also serve as habitat for birds and beneficial rodents. For example, insects such as Chrysoperla carnea and the Ichneumon fly can prey on pests.   The concept was developed by the Game & Wildlife Conservation Trust in collaboration with the University of Southampton.

Other important benefits can be providing habitat for pollinators and endangered species. If using local native plants, endemic and indigenous flora and fauna restoration ecology is supported.

History of the term 
According to a March 2005 draft entry for the Oxford English Dictionary, the term first came into use in the early 1990s, with published examples including the August 22, 1992 issue of the New Scientist and an October 12, 1994 reference in The Guardian society section:
‘Beetle banks’, a recent initiative by the Game Conservancy Trust, would also help encourage ground-nesting birds while creating cover for aphid-eating bugs with more pay-off in savings on aphicides.

See also

Beneficial insects
Buffer strip
Insect hotel
List of companion plants
List of pest-repelling plants

References

External links
Beetle bank, from the Game & Wildlife Conservation Trust website
Create and maintain beetle banks, from the DEFRA website, 2021

Biological pest control beetles
Sustainable agriculture
Ecological restoration
1990s neologisms